Father and Son (父子情) is a 1981 Hong Kong film directed by Allen Fong. It won the Best Film Award at the 1st Hong Kong Film Awards.

The story is about a not well-educated father with low-income job who wishes his son can become an important and successful person.  However, his son cannot understand his father's wishes and often is in trouble and got 
expelled from school.  Despite his son's failure in school, the father is determined that he should get a good education so he marries his oldest daughter off to a rich man to ensure that his son's can study abroad and the college fee being paid.

Cast 
 Shi Lei as Law San Muk
 Chu Hung as Mrs Law (as Hung Chu)
 Yung Wai-Man as Law Family Younger Brother 
 Cheung Yu-Ngor as Law Kar-Hing
 Yun Sin-Mei as Law Kar-Hei

Awards
1st Hong Kong Film Awards
 Won: Best Film
 Won: Best Director - Allen Fong

References

External links
 IMDb entry

1981 films
Best Film HKFA
Hong Kong drama films
Films directed by Allen Fong
Films with screenplays by Lilian Lee
1980s Hong Kong films